The Maligawatta stampede was a fatal incident which occurred on 21 May 2020, near a Muslim Jumma residence in Maligawatta, Colombo-10, amid lockdown and curfew which was imposed in the area due to COVID-19 pandemic in the country. The incident happened around 1:00pm while charity donation program was conducted to distribute money for the Maligawatta area residents on the eve of Ramadan.

Incident 
Nearly 300-400 people were reported to have gathered in a queue during a private charity donation program conducted by businessman Zarook Hajiyar based in Dehiwala with the purpose of distributing money at least Rs. 5000 per person for the area residents, especially to the poor. Around three women were killed due to the stampede and it was revealed that it happened due to the panic situation and careless behaviour among women. Nine people were severely injured including seven women and four women who were injured in the stampede have been reported to be in critical condition after being admitted to the Colombo National Hospital.

Six suspects who were involved in relief distribution were arrested mainly for conducting such an event amid coronavirus and for not maintaining proper hygienic measures, ignoring the ban on public gatherings. Suspects related to the incident were remanded until 4 June.

References 

2020 in Sri Lanka
History of Colombo District
Human stampedes in 2020
Human stampedes in Asia
Man-made disasters in Sri Lanka
May 2020 events in Asia
2020 disasters in Sri Lanka